The following is a timeline of the history of San Jose, California, United States.

Prior to the 19th century

 1777 – Spanish pueblo San Jose de Guadalupe founded.
 1797 – San Jose mission founded.

19th century
 1803 – San Jose de Guadalupe church built.
 1805 - Mission San Jose's church built in 1805, not 1803, and named La Mission del Gloriosisimo Patriarch San Jose, or just Mission San Jose, but not San Jose de Guadalupe according to San Jose Mission's history page.
 1809 - Mission San Jose's church completed and dedicated.
 1822 – Mexicans in power.
 1840 – Population: 750 (approximate).
 1846 – Town occupied by U.S. forces.
 1849 – December: Town becomes capital of the new state of California.
 1850
 City chartered.
 Josiah Belden becomes mayor.
 San Francisco-San Jose stagecoach begins operating.
 1851
 San Jose Weekly Visitor newspaper begins publication.
 College of Notre Dame established.
 1852 – San Jose Foundry in business.
 1853 – Hook and Ladder Company No.1 organized.
 1855
 San Jose Telegraph newspaper begins publication.
 San Jose City Hall built on North Market Street.
 1856 – Young Men's Literary Association organized.
 1857 – Minn's Evening School established.
 1861 – San Jose Daily Mercury newspaper begins publication.
 1862 - California State Normal School founded.
 1864 – San Francisco-San Jose Railway in operation.
 1865 – St. Joseph High School established.
 1866 – Santa Clara Argus newspaper begins publication.
 1867 – San Jose YMCA established.
 1868 – St. Joseph's Church built (approximate date).
 1870
 California State Normal School relocated to San Jose.
 Chinatown fire.
 Population: 9,089; county 26,246.
 1871 – University of the Pacific relocated to San Jose vicinity.
 1875 – San Jose Law Library, San Jose Fruit Packing Company, and California Pioneers of Santa Clara County established.
 1878 – Home of Benevolence founded.
 1879 – Daily Morning Times begins publication.
 1886 – Board of Trade organized.
 1888 – Lick Observatory established atop Mount Hamilton.
 1889
 New San Jose City Hall built in Market Plaza.
 O'Connor Hospital and Hotel Vendome established.
 1890 – Population: 18,060.
 1891 – Heald College established.
 1892 – First Unitarian Church of San Jose built.
 1892 – We and Our Neighbors Society (women's club) founded.
 1894 
 Associated Charities of San Jose established.
 Washburn Preparatory School established
 1895 – Post Office built.
 1897 – Good Government League organized.
 1900 – Population: 21,500.

20th century

1900s–1950s
 1902 – Naglee Park development begins (approximate date).
 1903
 Grauman's Theatre and San Jose Public Library building open.
 Bean Spray Company relocates to San Jose.
 1905 – Balloon, dirigible, and aeroplane exhibitions.
 1906 – April 18: San Francisco earthquake.
 1909
 KQW radio begins broadcasting.
 Santa Clara Valley Fruit Growers Association organized.
 1911 – East San Jose becomes part of San Jose.
 1921 – San Jose Junior College founded.
 1926 – Bank of Italy Building constructed.
 1927 – Fox California Theatre built.
 1933
 November 26: Hart killers lynched in St. James Park.
 Spartan Stadium opens.
 1936 – Willow Glen becomes part of San Jose.
 1937 – San Jose Civic Orchestra formed.
 1943 – IBM west coast headquarters established.
 1949
 San Jose Municipal Airport begins operating.
 Burbank Theatre, Garden Theatre, and Mayfair cinema open.
 Historical Museum of San José established.
 1950s – Community Service Organization activity begins in East San Jose.
 1952 – Population: 95,280.
 1957 – San Jose Peace & Justice Center founded.
 1958 – New San Jose City Hall opened at Civic Center.
 1959 – Santa Clara County United Fund established.

1960s–1990s

 1960 – Population: 204,196.
 1961
 Happy Hollow Zoo opens.
 IBM Shoebox invented.
 1964 – San Jose Century 21 cinema built.
 1967 – Junior League of San Jose and Center for Employment Training established.
 1968 – Alviso becomes part of city.
 1969 – Century Theatre cinema opens.
 1970
 Regional Metropolitan Transportation Commission established.
 Population: 447,025.
 1971
 Norman Mineta becomes mayor.
 San José Historical Museum Association and Sourisseau Academy for State and Local History established.
 1972 – Food Machinery Corporation headquarters relocates from San Jose to Chicago. 
 1973 – Willow Glen Neighborhood Association formed.
 1974 – Santa Clara County Transportation Agency, San Jose Earthquakes soccer club, and Second Harvest Food Bank established.
 1975
 Evergreen Valley College active.
 Janet Gray Hayes becomes mayor.
 1977 – San Jose Museum of Quilts & Textiles founded.
 1980 – Rotary Club of San Jose and San Jose Repertory Theatre founded.
 1981 – Roman Catholic Diocese of San Jose established.
 1982 – Adobe in business.
 1983
 1983 San Jose School District California bankruptcy
 Tom McEnery becomes mayor.
 1985 – Market Post Tower built.
 1986
 First Community Housing and San Jose Cleveland Ballet founded.
 IBM Almaden Research Center opens.
 1987
 Japanese American Museum of San Jose, Chinese Historical and Cultural Project, and Los Fundadores y Amigos de Alta California established.
 Fairmont Hotel built.
 1988 – Fairmont Plaza built.
 1989 – Loma Prieta earthquake.
 1990
 Tech Museum of Innovation and San Jose International Airport's new terminal open.
 Population: 782,248.
 1991
 Tathagata Meditation Center, Santa Clara Valley MultiService Center, and Filipino American National Historical Society chapter founded.
 Susan Hammer becomes mayor.
 San Jose Sharks begin play.
 1992
 Saba Islamic Center active.
 Chinmaya Mission San Jose founded.
 1993 – Plaza Park renamed Plaza de César Chávez.
 1994
 City government-public computer-enabled communication ("Virtual Valley") in operation.
 San Jose Clash soccer team formed.
 1995
 AuctionWeb (eBay) in business.
 Zoe Lofgren becomes U.S. representative for California's 16th congressional district.
 1998
 City website online (approximate date).
 History San José nonprofit incorporated.
 1999 – Ron Gonzales becomes mayor.
 2000 – Population: 894,943.

21st century

 2001
 Bay Area CyberRays soccer team, and Silicon Valley De-Bug collective established.
 Mike Honda becomes U.S. representative for California's 15th congressional district.
 2002 – Symphony Silicon Valley founded.
 2003 – Sobrato Office Tower built.
 2005 – San Jose City Hall returned downtown.
 2006 – June: Mayor Gonzales arrested.
 2007 – Chuck Reed becomes mayor.
 2008 – The 88 building constructed.
 2010
 Three Sixty Residences built.
 Population: 945,942.
 2011 – October: Occupy San José begins.
 2013 – Population: 998,537.
 2014
 Population tops 1,000,000.
 December: Homeless camp cleared.
 2021 – The San Jose shooting occurs, killing ten people including the gunman.

See also
 History of San Jose, California
 List of mayors of San Jose, California
 National Register of Historic Places listings in Santa Clara County, California
Timeline of the San Francisco Bay Area
 Timeline of California
 Timelines of other cities in the Northern California area of California: Fresno, Mountain View, Oakland, Sacramento, San Francisco

References

Bibliography

Published in the 19th century
 
 G.H. Hare, Hare's Guide to San Jose and Vicinity for Tourists and New Settlers (San Jose, 1872)

Published in the 20th century
 
 1907
 1911
 
 
 
 
 
 
 
 
 
 
 
 
 
  (fulltext via Open Library)

Published in the 21st century

External links

 Digital Public Library of America. Items related to San Jose, California, various dates

 
San Jose, California-related lists
san jose